The Deer Creek Open was a professional golf tournament on the Ben Hogan Tour in 1990. Also known as the Ben Hogan Kansas City Classic, it was played at Deer Creek Golf Course in Overland Park, Kansas.

In 1990 the winner earned $20,000.

Winners

References

Former Korn Ferry Tour events
Golf in Kansas